Roland Vólent (born 23 September 1992) is a Hungarian football player who plays for Tiszakécske.

Club career

Budapest Honved
He made his debut on 28 April 2009 against BFC Siófok in a match that ended 0–2.

Club honours

Budapest Honvéd FC
Hungarian Super Cup:
Runners-up: 2009

References

External links
Player profile at HLSZ

1992 births
Living people
People from Békéscsaba
Hungarian footballers
Hungary youth international footballers
Association football forwards
Nemzeti Bajnokság I players
Nemzeti Bajnokság II players
Békéscsaba 1912 Előre footballers
Budapest Honvéd FC players
Budapest Honvéd FC II players
Soproni VSE players
Kazincbarcikai SC footballers
BFC Siófok players
Balmazújvárosi FC players
Szigetszentmiklósi TK footballers
Gyirmót FC Győr players
Szolnoki MÁV FC footballers
Tiszakécske FC footballers
Sportspeople from Békés County
21st-century Hungarian people